David Unger may refer to:

 David A. Unger (born 1971), film talent and literary agent
 David Unger (author) (born 1950), Guatemalan-American author and translator
 David Unger (journalist) (born 1947), American journalist
 David Unger (director) on List of Austrian films of the 2000s

See also
 David Ungar, American computer scientist